VV Almkerk is an association football club from Almkerk, Netherlands. It was founded on 4 October 1945. Its home ground is Sportpark Almkerk. The first male squad of VV Almkerk plays in Eerste Klasse Saturday South since 2018. Coach is Ad van Seeters, who replaced Robert Roest in the summer of 2019.

References

External links 
 Official website

Football clubs in the Netherlands
Football clubs in Altena, North Brabant
Association football clubs established in 1945
1945 establishments in the Netherlands